FC Ivatsevichi is a Belarusian football club based in Ivatsevichi, Brest Oblast. The club currently plays in Belarusian Second League.

History 
The club was founded in 2016. They spent first two years playing in Brest Oblast league. In 2018 FC Ivatsevichi joined Belarusian Second League.

Current squad
As of September 2022

References

External links
Official website of Belarusian Second League

Association football clubs established in 2016
Football clubs in Belarus
2016 establishments in Belarus